A safe room or panic room is a fortified room that is installed in a private residence or business to provide a safe shelter, or hiding place, for the inhabitants in the event of a break in, home invasion, tornado, terror attack, or other threat. Safe rooms usually contain communications equipment, so that law enforcement authorities can be contacted.

Construction techniques 

The most basic safe room is simply a closet with the hollow-core door replaced with an exterior-grade solid-core door that has a deadbolt and longer hinge screws and strike-plate screws to resist battering. Sometimes, the ceiling is reinforced, or gated, to prevent easy access from the attic or from an overhead crawl space.

More expensive safe rooms have walls and a door reinforced with sheets of steel, Kevlar, or bullet-resistant fiberglass. The hinges and strike plate are often reinforced with long screws. Some safe rooms may also have externally vented ventilation systems and a separate telephone connection. They might also connect to an escape shaft.

Safe rooms in the basement or on a concrete slab can be built with concrete walls, a building technique that is normally not possible on the upper floors of wood-framed structures unless there is significant structural reinforcement to the building.

The U.S. State Department often uses steel grillwork much like a jail to seal off parts of a home used by U.S. Foreign Service members overseas when they are living in cities with a high crime threat.  In some cities, the entire upstairs area is grilled off, as well as every window and door to the home.  Other homes have steel doors to one or more bedrooms that can be bolted closed to provide time for security forces to arrive.

For strong storms or tornadoes, a storm safe room must be built to withstand high winds and flying debris, even if the rest of the residence becomes severely damaged or destroyed. Specific concerns include:
 
 The safe room should be adequately anchored to the foundation to resist overturning and uplift. 
 The walls, ceiling, and door of the shelter should withstand wind pressure and resist penetration by wind-borne objects or falling debris. 
 The connections between all parts of the safe room should be strong enough to resist separation by wind.
 Sections of either interior or exterior residence walls which are used as walls of the safe room, should be separated from the structure of the residence so that damage to the residence will not cause damage to the safe room.

Features 
Safe rooms may contain communications equipment, such as a cellular telephone, land-line telephone or an amateur radio transceiver, so that law enforcement authorities can be contacted. There may also be a monitor for external security cameras and an alarm system.  In basic safe rooms, a peephole in the door may be used for a similar purpose. Safe rooms are typically stocked with basic emergency and survival items such as a flashlight, blankets, a first-aid kit, water, packaged food, self-defense tools, a gas mask, and a simple portable toilet. High-end safe rooms may have a gun closet, a biodefense air-filtration system that removes biological and nuclear contaminants, and a panic button that locks down the entire house.

Safe rooms can be hidden behind many household features, such as mirrors, wardrobes, bookcases, sliding bookcases, and even fireplaces.

Citadel on ships 

Warships with CBRN protection generally have a central citadel, with a degree of armour protection as well as a filtered air system.

Anti-piracy
Safe rooms on civilian ships, sometimes called "citadels", are increasingly being installed as a countermeasure against piracy. When attacked, the crew can retreat into the safe room and call for help (which in the case of ships of some countries may include the intervention of military forces). Because of the nature of ship construction, the safe room is typically constructed in a concealed location within a void within the ship, to resist efforts by the pirates to find the crew before help arrives. Safe rooms sometimes have facilities to allow the crew to remotely disable the ship's engines and electronic systems, making it impossible for the pirates to sail the ship to a location they control. The safe room is also typically armoured against direct physical attack, to allow the crew to remain safe for a few hours, even if located by the pirates, and to allow rescuing forces full scope for the use of armed force to re-take the ship without risk to the crew.

The effect of the safe room is thus to deny the pirates access to the crew for hostage-taking, to remove the capability to move the ship to a location favourable for the pirates, and to facilitate retaking the ship by armed force without risk to the crew. The retreat of the crew to a safe room could encourage the pirates to leave the ship of their own volition.

Safe rooms have been used as a defensive measure in ships threatened by piracy in Somalia. In 2010, 4,185 seafarers had been attacked and 1,090 taken hostage, but 342 were kept safe in a citadel.

See also 
 Blast shelter
 Bomb shelter
 Fallout shelter
 Merkhav Mugan
 Panic Room (movie)
 Preppers
 Retreat (survivalism)
 Storm cellar

References

Further reading 
 

Anti-piracy
Civil defense
Rooms
Security technology
Ship compartments